Conus paraguana is a species of sea snail, a marine gastropod mollusk in the family Conidae, the cone snails and their allies.

Like all species within the genus Conus, these snails are predatory and venomous. They are capable of "stinging" humans, therefore live ones should be handled carefully or not at all.

Description
Original description: "Shell small for genus, thin, slender, smooth and polished; spire elevated, straight-sided; shoulder slightly rounded, anterior end with 8 deeply-impressed sulci; spire whorls smooth; color yellow with two wide bands of pale tan, closely-packed lines of dots and dashes; wide bands of dots separated by wide, white band around mid-body; white mid-body band with 2 lines of tiny tan dots; spire whorls heavily marked with numerous, large, yellow-tan flammules; interior of aperture white; periostracum thin, yellow, transparent, smooth."

The size of the shell varies between 18 mm and 25 mm.

Distribution
Locus typicus: "Gulf of Venezuela, off Los Taques, 
Paraguana Peninsula, Falcon, Venezuela."

This species occurs in the Caribbean Sea off Venezuela.

References

 Petuch, E. J. 1987. New Caribbean Molluscan Faunas. 111
 Puillandre N., Duda T.F., Meyer C., Olivera B.M. & Bouchet P. (2015). One, four or 100 genera? A new classification of the cone snails. Journal of Molluscan Studies. 81: 1-23

External links
 To Biodiversity Heritage Library (1 publication)
 To USNM Invertebrate Zoology Mollusca Collection
 To World Register of Marine Species
 Cone Shells - Knights of the Sea
 Gastropods.com: Gradiconus flavescens var. paraguana

paraguana
Gastropods described in 1987